Krishna Balagita, popular by his first name Krishna (born March 26, 1967 in Jakarta), is a Jakarta-born musician, arranger and composer. He achieves his popularity through Ada Band, a well-known band in Indonesia whose songs hit are Krishna's own creation.

Career
Krishna started his professional career in music when he was 21. He joined some bands and performed in the café or hotel. Sometimes he would perform solo or played some pop music with a band. In other occasion he would play standard tunes with jazz quartet formation. He finally met Suriandika Satjadibrata and Baim in 1997. The three young men agreed to form a band called Ada Band. Seharusnya was the first album released in 1997 and the song with the same title got the success. Krishna successfully brought Ada Band to be one of the popular bands in the country. Masih, Yang Terbaik Bagimu, Haruskah Ku Mati, and Manusia Bodoh are some of the hit. Ada Band on the other hand was able to feature Dave Koz to play 'Masih'. 
Meanwhile, he was not completely forgot jazz and released a solo album 'Sign of Eight' in 2002, his first jazz album. Indra Lesmana, Gilang Ramadhan, Dewa Budjana, Tohpati and Indro Hardjodikoro contributed to Krishna’s jazz project.  
It was in 2007 when he decided to start his solo career and formed Krishna and The New Spectrum. EMI music Indonesia produced the album with many popular artists such as Ian Kasela, Dudi Yovie Nuno, Happy Salma, Zacky 'Kapten' and many more. This album was prepared in the orchestra touch.

Discography
 Ada Band
 Seharusnya (1997) -It Must be Love-
 Peradaban 2000 (1999) -Year 2000-
 Tiara (2000) -Desperately-
 Metamorphosis (2003) -Metamorph-
 Discography (2005) -Flash Back-
 Heaven of Love (2004) -Heaven of Love-
 Romantic Rhapsody (2006) -Romantic Rhapsody
 Cinema Story (2007) -Cinema Story-
 Solo
 Sign of Eight (2002) -Sign of Eight-
 Light From Heaven (2007) -Light From Heaven-

References

External links

1967 births
Indonesian pianists
Indonesian songwriters
Living people
Javanese people
Musicians from Jakarta
Anugerah Musik Indonesia winners
21st-century pianists